Neotetraonchus is a genus of flatworms belonging to the monotypic family Neotetraonchidae.

The species of this genus are found in Central America.

Species:

Neotetraonchus bravohollisae 
Neotetraonchus bravohollisi 
Neotetraonchus bychowskyi 
Neotetraonchus felis 
Neotetraonchus proops 
Neotetraonchus proops 
Neotetraonchus vegrandis

References

Monopisthocotylea
Platyhelminthes genera